The Piedmont ringlet (Erebia meolans) is a member of the family Nymphalidae. It is an Alpine butterfly.

Description in Seitz
E. stygne O. (= pirene Hbn).) (35 g). Upperside of both wings dark black-brown. The forewing has before the distal margin a russet-brown band which is broad anteriorly, strongly tapering behind, and bears in its upper portion 2 white-centred black ocelli; towards the hindmargin an additional, somewhat smaller ocellus is visible. The hindwing has 3—4 white-centred ocelli which are edged with brown. The underside of the forewing is in male and female but little lighter than the upper, the distal band being broader, lighter brown and continuous. The hindwing beneath dark brown in the male, brown grey in the female . The ocelli as on the upperside, but smaller, being narrowly edged with brown. Specimens from the Black Forest are much brighter coloured, the broad russet yellow band of the forewing commences near the costal margin of the forewing and extends to the hindmargin, remaining of nearly even width. In the band there are always 3 - 5 large black white-centred ocelli, and, especially often in the female, there is above
the first ocellus, towards the apex, an additional smaller ocellus with white pupil, this ocellus not being visible beneath. On the hindwing the brown band is as wide as on the forewing, the ocelli, 3-4 in number, are likewise large and have conspicuous white pupils. — The form pyrenaica Ruhl , which is found in the Western Pyrenees in June, differs from the first-described form only  in the reduction of the red colour. — in ab. valesiaca Elw., which occurs in Wallis as well on the Simplon, and even in the Pyrenees, the russet-red is effaced in the female except for faint traces, being altogether absent from the male. — stygne occurs in the Black Forest and the Thuringian Forest, the Jura, Alps, Vosges, the Pyrenees, and Apennines and extends eastwards to Armenia; in June and July; the butterfly begins to appear already below 3000 ft. and goes rarely above the tree-line.

References

External links
Fauna Europaea Distribution
Lepiforum In German but correctly identified insects in the excellent photos

Erebia
Butterflies of Europe
Butterflies described in 1798